José María Paz (born July 3, 1978 in Libertador General San Martín, Jujuy) is an Argentine football defender who currently plays for Macará in the Ecuadorian Serie B.

In his native country he played for senior clubs such as River Plate, Gimnasia de Jujuy, Unión de Santa Fe, Lanús and Huracán. He also had two spells in the Liga de Fútbol Profesional Boliviano with Blooming.

Paz also played in the Argentine Primera B Nacional for Club Atlético Tucumán once, and Club Sportivo Ben Hur on two occasions. In 2008, he moved to Venezuela and signed for Monagas Sport Club from Venezuela. After two seasons, he transferred to Ecuadorian second division club Macará.

Club titles

External links
 Argentine Primera statistics  
 
 BDFA profile 

1978 births
Living people
Sportspeople from Jujuy Province
Argentine footballers
Association football defenders
Club Atlético Huracán footballers
Club Atlético River Plate footballers
Gimnasia y Esgrima de Jujuy footballers
Club Atlético Lanús footballers
Unión de Santa Fe footballers
Atlético Tucumán footballers
Club Blooming players
C.S.D. Macará footballers
Argentine Primera División players
Argentine expatriate footballers
Expatriate footballers in Bolivia
Expatriate footballers in Venezuela
Argentine expatriate sportspeople in Venezuela
Argentine expatriate sportspeople in Bolivia